Walsh Report may refer to

 Walsh Report (cryptography), an Australian cryptography policy review
 The Commission on Industrial Relations (also known as the Walsh Commission)